Armand Schönberger (1885 in Galgóc – 1974 in Budapest) was a Hungarian painter.

References 

 

1885 births
1974 deaths
People from Hlohovec
20th-century Hungarian painters
Hungarian male painters
20th-century Hungarian male artists